Prida can refer to:

People
Dolores Prida (1943–2013), Cuban-American columnist and playwright
Joaquín Fernández Prida (1865–1942), Spanish lawyer and politician
Jorge Núñez Prida

Other
Prida (spider), a genus of spiders in the family Oonopidae